Alessio Sitti (born March 18, 1996) is an Italian  volleyball player, a member of the club San Giustino Pallavolo.

References

External links
 LegaVolley profile
 Volleybox profile
 CEV profile

1996 births
Living people
Italian men's volleyball players